Reginald Lochiel Peterson (16 August 1907 – 23 May 1961) was an Australian rules footballer who played with Essendon and St Kilda in the Victorian Football League (VFL).

Family
The son of Henry Christian Peterson (1872-1939), and Jessie Peterson (1877-1943), née MacKenzie, Reginald Lochiel Peterson was born at Unley, South Australia on 16 August 1907.

He married Joyce Esmerald Morris (1916-1979) in 1940.

Military service
Peterson later served in the Australian Army during World War II. He was a prisoner of war in Malaya.

Death
He died at the Repatriation General Hospital in Heidelberg, Victoria on 23 May 1961.

Notes

References
 
 Maplestone, M., Flying Higher: History of the Essendon Football Club 1872–1996, Essendon Football Club, (Melbourne), 1996. 
 
 B883, VX39288: World War Two Service Record: Sergeant Reginald Lochiel Peterson (VX39288), National Archives of Australia.

External links 

Reg Peterson's playing statistics from The VFA Project

1907 births
1961 deaths
Australian rules footballers from Victoria (Australia)
Port Melbourne Football Club players
Brunswick Football Club players
Brighton Football Club players
Essendon Football Club players
St Kilda Football Club players